

Anseküla Lighthouse (Estonian: Anseküla tuletorn) is a lighthouse located in Anseküla, on the eastern side of the Sõrve Peninsula, on the island of Saaremaa, in Estonia. The original light was on a church, which was destroyed during World War II in 1944. The current lighthouse was built in 1953.  It is a concrete square tower, with a gallery but no lantern. The lighthouse's glare configuration flashes a white glare every 1.5 seconds.

See also 

 List of lighthouses in Estonia

References

External links 

 

Lighthouses completed in 1953
Resort architecture in Estonia
Lighthouses in Estonia
Saaremaa Parish
Buildings and structures in Saaremaa
Tourist attractions in Saare County